Clayton D. Moss (born 25 June 1980) is an Australian actor and writer, born in Sydney, Australia.

Acting career

Television
Clayton's television credits include episodes of All Saints (2008), Underbelly (2009), and Rescue: Special Ops (2010).

Film
Clay made his feature film debut in 2011 with Dealing with Destiny alongside Luke Arnold and Emma Leonard. In a review for the film, Filmink magazine noted him as one of "Australia's emerging acting talent".

Theater
Clayton performed at Belvoir St. Downstairs Theater for the play MATE. He was also cast in Devil May Care's production of John Donnelly's Songs Of Grace And Redemption for The Sydney Fringe in 2010, receiving favorable reviews for his performance of the character Steve. He returned to the Sydney Fringe in 2016 to perform Sarah Kane's Crave to similar critical reception.

Filmography

Bibliography

References

External links 
 
 

1980 births
Australian male television actors
Living people
Australian male film actors